The U.S. Army Acquisition Support Center (USAASC) is part of the Office of the Assistant Secretary of the Army for Acquisition, Logistics, and Technology (ASA(ALT)).  USAASC is headquartered at Fort Belvoir, Va.

Overview 
USAASC was established in its current form on October 1, 2002. USAASC was designated as a direct reporting unit (DRU) of the Assistant Secretary of the Army for Acquisition, Logistics, and Technology (ASA(ALT)) on October 16, 2006.

Its core functions include:

 Providing career development support for the Army Acquisition Workforce and the United States Army Acquisition Corps, military and civilian acquisition leaders.
 Providing customer service and support to the Army program executive offices in the areas of human resources, resource management (manpower and budget), program structure, and acquisition information  management.
 Advising the ASA(ALT) and others on acquisition issues.

USAASC leadership 

Mr. Craig Spisak has served as the director of the USAASC since June 2005. Mr. Spisak also serves as the Deputy Director for Acquisition Career Management.  Mr. Spisak retired from federal service in July 2021.  He was succeeded by Mr. Ronald (Rob) Richardson as the ASC Director and Director for Acquisition Career Management (DACM) in August 2021.

Director, Acquisition Career Management (DACM) 

The DACM Office is the organization within the USAASC responsible for providing professional development opportunities for the Army Acquisition Workforce and establishing the procedures that train, educate, and develop members of the workforce.

The Army DACM Office works directly with the Defense Acquisition University (DAU), the Assistant Secretary of Defense (Acquisition), and the Under Secretary of Defense (Acquisition, Technology and Logistics) to enable workforce initiatives and to serve as advocates for the Army Acquisition Workforce.

The Defense Acquisition Workforce Improvement Act, aimed to professionalize the defense acquisition workforce. The Army DACM Office supports DAWIA-required training, education and experience for the workforce through three main lines of effort.

DACM leadership 

Lt. Gen. Robert L. Marion was confirmed by the Senate to succeed Lt. Gen. Paul A. Ostrowski as the Principal Military Deputy to the Assistant Secretary of the Army for Acquisition, Logistics and Technology (ASA(ALT)) and the Director, Army Acquisition Corps on March 20, 2020.

Mr. Ronald (Rob) Richardson, Director, U.S. Army Acquisition Support Center, serves as the DACM. His staff, the Army DACM Office, enables the mission of the DACM.

See also 
Assistant Secretary of the Army for Acquisition, Logistics, and Technology (ASA(ALT))
Defense Acquisition University (DAU)
Under Secretary of Defense (Acquisition, Technology, and Logistics)
Defense Acquisition Workforce Improvement Act

References

External links 
 Army Acquisition Support Center Website
Army Acquisition Center of Excellence (AACoE)
Secretary of the Army Excellence in Contracting Awards
U.S. Army Weapon Systems
Army Acquisition Demonstration Project (AcqDemo)
Army.mil
APD.Army.mil
USAASC.Armyalt.com
DVIDShub.net
DefenseSystems.com
USAASC leadership

United States Department of Defense agencies
United States defense procurement
Military simulation
United States Army civilians